Geosaurinae is a subfamily of metriorhynchid crocodyliforms from the Middle Jurassic to the Early Cretaceous (Bathonian - Aptian) of Europe, North America and South America. Named by Richard Lydekker, in 1889, it contains the metriorhynchids Suchodus, Purranisaurus, Neptunidraco, Tyrannoneustes, Torvoneustes, Dakosaurus, Geosaurus and Plesiosuchus. The last four taxa form a tribe within Geosaurinae, the Geosaurini. Geosaurinae is one of two subfamilies of Metriorhynchidae, the other being Metriorhynchinae.

These marine reptiles were widespread during the Late Jurassic and Early Cretaceous, their fossilized remains are being frequently found on various places around the world.

Phylogeny 

Geosaurinae is a stem-based taxon defined in 2009 as the most inclusive clade consisting of Geosaurus giganteus, but not Metriorhynchus geoffroyii. Geosaurini was named by Lydekker in 1889, and it is a node-based taxon defined by Andrea Cau and Federico Fanti in 2011 as the least inclusive clade consisting of Geosaurus giganteus, Dakosaurus maximus and Torvoneustes carpenteri. The cladogram below follows the topology from a 2020 analysis by Young et al.

References

Early Cretaceous crocodylomorphs
Middle Jurassic crocodylomorphs
Middle Jurassic first appearances
Early Cretaceous extinctions
Late Jurassic crocodylomorphs
Thalattosuchians